Oktogon may refer to:
 Oktogon (intersection), a major street junction in Budapest, Hungary, octagonal in shape
 Oktogon (Budapest Metro), a metro station near the aforementioned intersection
 Oktogon (Zagreb), a passageway in central Zagreb, Croatia